Reverification occurs when an employer asks a worker to show his authorization to work after the employee has already shown work authorization documents to the employer. This may be needed when the employee's original work authorization expires.

Further reading

References 

United States labor law